La herencia (English title: Legacy) is a Mexican telenovela that aired on Las Estrellas from 28 March 2022 to 15 July 2022. The series is produced by Juan Osorio for TelevisaUnivision, and is an adaptation of the Chilean telenovela Hijos del Monte. It stars Michelle Renaud, Matías Novoa, Daniel Elbittar, Emmanuel Palomares, Juan Pablo Gil, and Mauricio Henao.

Plot 
The telenovela takes place in an avocado farm called "Santa Catalina", where Severiano del Monte and Catalina Arango, Severiano's wife, and their five adopted sons live. Catalina was never able to get pregnant, but Severiano always wanted to have male descendants and opted for adoption. Severiano passes away, and the lives of his sons change on the day of the reading of the will, with the unexpected appearance of Sara, their sister, whom they did not know existed.  Sara is the daughter of Deborah Portillo, Severiano's former lover. Sara grew up believing that her father was never interested in her. As Severiano's only biological child, Sara is willing to accept the inheritance. Everything gets complicated because the will has a suspensive condition clause that obliges the six siblings to live for a year in the farm in order not to lose their right to the inheritance.

Cast 
 Michelle Renaud as Sara del Monte Portillo
 Matías Novoa as Juan del Monte
 Emmanuel Palomares as Simón del Monte
 Daniel Elbittar as Pedro del Monte
 Mauricio Henao as Mateo del Monte
 Juan Pablo Gil as Lucas del Monte
 Elizabeth Álvarez as Deborah Portillo
 Tiaré Scanda as Rosa
 Paulina Matos as Julieta Millán
 Julián Gil as Próspero Millán Rico
 Juan Carlos Barreto as Modesto
 Diego de Erice as Cornelio
 Amaranta Ruíz as Adela Cruz
 Verónica Jaspeado as Bertha
 Gloria Aura as Beatriz Hernandez
 Mildred Feuchter as Paloma
 Nicole Curiel as Jessica
 Esmeralda Gómez as Alondra
 Christian Ramos as Brayan
 André de Regíl as Brandon
 Farah Justiniani as Dulce
 Andrés Ruanova as Tadeo
 Sergio Basañez as Dante
 Roberto Blandón as Chavita
 Rafael Inclán as Agustín

Recurring 
 Lucero Lander as Aurora
 Tian Altamirano as Amado
 Alberto Pavón as Henry Miller
 Manuel Riguezza as Bruno
 Gina Pedret as Irma
 Jessica Jimenez as Julieta 'Baby' Alcaraz

Guest stars 
 Ana Ciocchetti as Catalina Arango
 Leonardo Daniel as Severiano del Monte

Production 
Filming began of the telenovela began in December 2021. The first teaser was shown on 28 February 2022. Filming concluded in May 2022.

Ratings 
 
}}

Episodes

Notes

References

External links 
 

2022 telenovelas
2022 Mexican television series debuts
2022 Mexican television series endings
2020s Mexican television series
Televisa telenovelas
Mexican telenovelas
Spanish-language telenovelas
Mexican television series based on Chilean television series